Promite  is a dark brown, salty food paste derived from yeast extract. It is primarily used as a spread on sandwiches and toast similar to Vegemite and Marmite. Promite was invented in the 1950s by Henry Lewis & Company and marketed under the Masterfoods brand. Henry Lewis & Company later became MasterFoods Australia and New Zealand, before being bought out by Mars, Incorporated, a privately owned U.S. company, in 1967. Promite has continued to be manufactured and primarily sold in Australia.

Like Vegemite, it is made from leftover brewer's yeast and vegetable extract, however Promite achieves a sweeter taste through the addition of sugar.

Ingredients
According to Mars Customer care, "In 2013, we removed vitamins Thiamin (B1), Riboflavin (B2) and Niacin (B3), as well as two flavour enhancers, and found this to benefit some consumers sensitive to those vitamins, without impacting taste or texture". However, some vitamins remain from the raw ingredients, approximately:

See also

 Cenovis
 Marmite (New Zealand)
 Vitam-R
 List of spreads

References

External links
Promite

Yeast extract spreads
Mars brands
Umami enhancers
Australian condiments
Brand name condiments
Food paste
Products introduced in the 1950s

Promite is not a yeast extract. It is a vegetable extract.